The 1894 Costa Rican general election was held between 4 and 6 of February (first degree) and 1 April of that year (second degree). The election was quite controversial due to the questionable practices from the government of José Joaquín Rodríguez Zeledón who supported his son-in-law Rafael Yglesias using all sorts of measures to assure his victory, going as far as to even arrest his main rival.

In the previous election Rodríguez won thanks to the endorsement of the Catholic Church and the up to that point marginalized conservatives over liberal and freemason Ascensión Esquivel Ibarra. However, the intent of the then liberal government of Bernardo Soto Alfaro of almost reject the results and appoint Esquivel anyway almost caused a Catholic uprising. Ironically, this date is commemorated in Costa Rica as "Democracy's Day".

After the victory, Rodríguez' party, the Constitutional Party broke away forming two new parties; the ultra-Catholic, conservative and anti-Masonic Catholic Union led by Costa Rican bishop of German origin Bernard Thiel, and the loosely liberal Civil Party led by Rodriguez' son-in-law Yglesias. Rodriguez used all sorts of pressures and trick against Trejos, pressuring the Electoral College (as at the time Costa Rican elections were indirect) and forcing the results in favor of his relative. Soon after Yglesia's victory the Constitution was amended forbidding the existence of religious-based parties, thus making Catholic Union illegal.

Results
Second grade electors, original estimate

Actual results

References

Elections in Costa Rica
1894 elections in Central America
1894 in Costa Rica